Chahan (also Romanized as Chāhān) is a village in Rameshk Rural District, Chah Dadkhoda District, Qaleh Ganj County, Kerman Province, Iran. At the 2006 census, its population was 138, in 41 families.

References 

Populated places in Qaleh Ganj County